Les chroniques du Wati Boss is a compilation album series of Wati B artists. On 8 July 2013, Volume 1 was released followed by Volume 2 on 12 September 2014 and Volume 3 on 8 September 2017.

Volume 1

Volume 2

Track list

Volume 3

Track list

Charts

Volume 1

Volume 2

References

2013 compilation albums
French-language albums